AK1200 is the stage name of Florida-based musician Dave Minner working in the jungle and drum and bass genres.'

Career

His first production effort was a 1993 remix of a Suburban Base Records track Somebody by Flex and Fats. AK1200 was also the first American DJ to play on U.K. pirate radio, alongside Swift and on Format FM alongside DJ Zinc.

His debut album SHOOTTOKILL was co-produced with Rob Playford of Moving Shadow. In the US, AK1200 has been credited for helping to increase the popularity of jungle and D&B due to his live performances and remixes, as well as for playing for free to help promote the style.

In 2000 he joined forces with Dieselboy and DJ Dara to create the annual Planet of the Drums tour.

Selective discography
 1998 Fully Automatic
 1996 Sub Base Classics
 1999 Lock & Roll – A Drum & Bass DJ Mix
 2000 Prepare for Assault
 2001 Mixed Live – Moonshine Overamerica, San Francisco
 2002 Shoot to Kill
 2003 At Close Range
 2007 Weapons of Tomorrow
 2008 Autopsy (with Gridlok)
 2018 The Light (with Liquid)

References

External links
 
 
 

American electronic musicians
American drum and bass musicians
Musicians from Orlando, Florida
American DJs
Record producers from Florida
Living people
Year of birth missing (living people)
Place of birth missing (living people)
Electronic dance music DJs